This article shows all participating team squads at the 2013 Women's NORCECA Volleyball Championship, held from September 16 to September 21, 2013 in Omaha, Nebraska, United States.



















References

External links
 NORCECA

N
N